The Office of the Commissioner of the Ministry of Foreign Affairs of the People's Republic of China in the Macao Special Administrative Region is an subordinated office of the Ministry of Foreign Affairs of the People's Republic of China established in accordance with the provisions of the Basic Law of Macau. It is responsible for dealing with foreign affairs related to the territory. The building is located at Sé.

Organizational structure
 Department of Policy Research
 Department of International Organizations and Legal Affairs
 Department of Consular Affairs
 Department of Public Diplomacy and Information
 Department of General Affairs

See also 

 Ministry of Foreign Affairs of the People's Republic of China
 Office of the Commissioner of the Ministry of Foreign Affairs of the People's Republic of China in the Hong Kong Special Administrative Region
 Liaison Office of the Central People's Government in the Macao Special Administrative Region
 People's Liberation Army Macau Garrison
 Office of the Macau Special Administrative Region in Beijing

References

External links 

 Office of the Commissioner of the Ministry of Foreign Affairs of the People's Republic of China in the Macao Special Administrative Region 

Ministry of Foreign Affairs of the People's Republic of China
Foreign relations of Macau
Government buildings in Macau